Lucid Interval is the third full-length album released by Cephalic Carnage. It was released in 2002 via Relapse Records. The album was reissued by Relapse Records with a bonus track on September 13, 2011.

Track listing

Personnel

Cephalic Carnage
 Lenzig Leal – vocals
 Zac Joe – guitar
 John Merryman – drums
 Steve Goldberg – guitar
 Jawsh Mullen – bass

Additional musicians
 Matt Blanks (Happy Pappy) – electronics, ambient noise
 Angela Vigil (Autopsy Commission) – vocals ("Anthro-Emesis")
 Donovan Breazaeale (Autopsy Commission) – vocals ("Anthro-Emesis")
 Diego Sanchez (Disgorge) – vocals ("Anthro-Emesis")
 A.J. Magana (Disgorge) – vocals ("Anthro-Emesis")
 Keith Sanchez (Catheter) – vocals ("The Isle of California")
 Keith Coombes (Deadspeak) – vocals ("Pseudo")
 Dirk (Evulsion) – vocals ("Pseudo")
 Terry Christbutcher (Excommunion) – vocals ("Zuno Gyakusatsu")
 The Choir of the Damned (Dave Otero (Serberus), Dirk Trujillo (Evulsion), Ron (Mandrake), Keith Sanchez, Tina Sanchez, Than Wilson (Deadspeak), Keith Coombes (Deadspeak)) – backing vocals ("Black Metal Sabbath")
 Ron (Mandrake) – vocals ("Cannabism")
 Tony Perez – acoustic guitar ("Cannabism")
 Joe Tapia (Laughing Dog, Noisear) – vocals ("Misguided")
 Alex Marquez (Laughing Dog, Noisear) – vocals ("Misguided") 
 Dylan Yost – violin ("Arsonist Savior")
 Jae Foetusgrubber – backing vocals ("Arsonist Savior")

Production
 Dave Otero – recording, production, mixing, mastering (Hellion II Studios)
 Cephalic Carnage – production
 Steve Sundberg – additional mastering
 Matthew F. Jacobson – executive production

References

External links
 Cephalic Carnage on Myspace

2002 albums
Cephalic Carnage albums
Relapse Records albums